The Women's 63 kg event at the 2022 World Judo Championships was held at the Humo Ice Dome arena in Tashkent, Uzbekistan on 9 October 2022.

Results

Finals

Repechage

Pool A

Pool B

Pool C

Pool D

References

External links
 

W63
World Judo Championships Women's Half Middleweight
World W63